The 1999 Italian Formula 3000 Championship was contested over 7 rounds. 16 different teams and 27 different drivers competed. In this one-make formula all teams had to utilize Lola T96/50 chassis with Zytek engines.

Entries

Calendar
All races were held in Italy, excepting Donington Park round which held in the United Kingdom.

Results

Note
Race 3 Pole Position originally won by Oliver Martini, but all his times were cancelled and he started from last grid position.

Race 3 original first finisher and winner Ananda Mikola, but he was disqualified due to an illegal positioning of the datalogger.

Championships standings

References

Formula 3000
Auto GP
1999 in motorsport
Italian Formula 3000